Nikolai Mikhaylovich Albov (15 October 1866, in Pavlovo, Gorbatov region, Nizhny Novgorod Governorate, Imperial Russia – 6 December 1897, in La Plata, Argentina) was a Russian botanist and geographer. He made his mark first as an explorer of the Caucasus, to which he made several extensive trips financed by the Swiss Botanist Society, and later, after having moved to Argentina in 1895, of the Southern regions of South America. He is credited with being arguably the first European explorer to have traveled extensively over Patagonia and Tierra del Fuego and (writing in Russian and French), described its flora.

He had published 155 names of plant specimens.

References 

1866 births
1897 deaths
People from Pavlovo, Nizhny Novgorod Oblast
People from Gorbatovsky Uyezd
19th-century botanists from the Russian Empire
Russian geographers
Russian explorers